Scott Field is a Paralympic Games swimmer from South Africa who competed mainly in category S13 events.

Scott competed in two Paralympics as part of the South African swimming team.  His first games were in the 2000 Summer Paralympic Games where he won silver in both the 50m and 100m freestyle, adding a bronze in the 100m butterfly and finishing fifth in the 200m medley.  In the 2004 Summer Paralympic Games he again won silver in the 100m freestyle, but could only manage bronze in the 50m freestyle.  He did however add silvers in both the 400m freestyle and 100m butterfly.

References

External links
 

Year of birth missing (living people)
Living people
South African male freestyle swimmers
Paralympic swimmers of South Africa
Paralympic silver medalists for South Africa
Paralympic bronze medalists for South Africa
Paralympic medalists in swimming
Swimmers at the 2000 Summer Paralympics
Swimmers at the 2004 Summer Paralympics
Medalists at the 2000 Summer Paralympics
Medalists at the 2004 Summer Paralympics
Commonwealth Games silver medallists for South Africa
Commonwealth Games medallists in swimming
Swimmers at the 2002 Commonwealth Games
S13-classified Paralympic swimmers
21st-century South African people
20th-century South African people
Medallists at the 2002 Commonwealth Games